Michelle Karin Löwenhielm (born 22 March 1995) is a Swedish ice hockey forward and the captain of SDE Hockey in the Swedish Women's Hockey League (SDHL). She represented  in the women’s ice hockey tournament at the 2014 Winter Olympics and at five IIHF Women's World Championships.

International career
Löwenhielm was selected for the Sweden women's national ice hockey team in the 2014 Winter Olympics. She played in all six games, scoring one goal and adding two assists.

As of 2014, Löwenhielm has also appeared for Sweden at two IIHF Women's World Championships. Her first appearance came in 2012.

Löwenhielm made four appearances for the Sweden women's national under-18 ice hockey team, at the IIHF World Women's U18 Championships, with the first in 2010. This included winning bronze medals in 2010, 2012 and 2013.

Career statistics
Through 2013–14 season

References

External links
 
 
 
 

1995 births
Living people
People from Sollentuna Municipality
Ice hockey people from Stockholm
Swedish women's ice hockey forwards
HV71 Dam players
Connecticut Whale (PHF) players
Minnesota Duluth Bulldogs women's ice hockey players
AIK Hockey Dam players
Olympic ice hockey players of Sweden
Ice hockey players at the 2014 Winter Olympics
Ice hockey players at the 2022 Winter Olympics
Swedish expatriate ice hockey players in the United States
SDE Hockey players
21st-century Swedish women